Antirrhinum cornutum (syn. Sairocarpus cornutus) is an uncommon species of New World snapdragon known by the common name spurred snapdragon.

It is endemic to northern California, where it grows in the inland mountains and the northern reaches of the Central Valley. This is an annual herb producing hairy, erect, non-climbing stems. Solitary flowers grow in the leaf axils along the stem. Each hairy-lipped snapdragon flower is purple-veined white and about a centimeter long.

External links
Jepson Manual Treatment
USDA Plants Profile
Photo gallery

cornutum
Flora of California
Plants described in 1849
Flora without expected TNC conservation status